Christopher Gavigan is an American entrepreneur, co-founder of The Honest Company, and founder and CEO of therapeutics brand PRIMA.  He is the author of Healthy Child Healthy World: Creating a Cleaner, Greener, Safer Home, published by Dutton in 2008.

In January 2012, Gavigan and business partners Jessica Alba and Brian Lee launched The Honest Company, focused on leading the clean lifestyle movement.

Gavigan has served as the CEO of Healthy Child Healthy World, an organization that works to advocate and improve children's and family's health by eliminating questionable toxins from their environment. He also was the founder of Pinnacle Expeditions, a California-based adventure travel company for teens.

Personal life 
He married Jessica Capshaw in 2004 and has four children: Luke, Eve, Poppy and Josephine.

Awards and recognition 
Entrepreneur of the Year by Ernst and Young in April 2014.
 WebMD's 2010 Health Hero Award
 Green Award 2007 by Elle

References

External links 

1974 births
Living people
21st-century American businesspeople
Place of birth missing (living people)
American male writers
University of California, Santa Barbara alumni
American business writers